Brick Body Kids Still Daydream is the fourth studio album by Open Mike Eagle. It was released via Mello Music Group on September 15, 2017. It includes guest appearances from Sammus and Has-Lo. It is a concept album about the Robert Taylor Homes, a public housing project in Chicago, Illinois. The cover art was illustrated by McKay Felt. Music videos were created for "95 Radios", "Brick Body Complex", "No Selling (Uncle Butch Pretending It Don't Hurt)", "Happy Wasteland Day", and "Hymnal". The album received widespread acclaim from critics and landed on several year-end lists.

Critical reception

The album received widespread acclaim from critics. At Metacritic, which assigns a weighted average score out of 100 to reviews from mainstream critics, the album received an average score of 82, based on 12 reviews, indicating "universal acclaim".

Matthew Ismael Ruiz of Pitchfork gave the album an 8.1 out of 10, saying, "Brick Body Kids Still Daydream serves as an antidote to dystopian depictions of the neighborhoods and communities on Chicago's South Side that are often one-dimensional, serving as a glimpse into the mind of a poet who can see the beauty and articulate it through the eyes of a child."

Andrew Gordon of The Skinny gave the album 4 out of 5 stars, calling it "[Open Mike Eagle's] most thematically coherent work yet." Aaron Williams of Uproxx said, "Fans of cascading rhymes and rewind-button-crushing wordplay will appreciate that Mike's gift of gab remains refreshingly (or stubbornly) intact in an era of stripped-down cadences and simplistic content."

Accolades

Track listing

Personnel
Credits adapted from liner notes.

 Open Mike Eagle – vocals, executive production
 Dan Miller – guitar (1)
 Exile – production (1, 5)
 Jordan Katz – additional production (1, 6, 10, 11), additional live instruments
 DJ Nobody – production (2)
 Sammus – vocals (3)
 Andrew Broder – production (3)
 Kenny Segal – production (4)
 Illingsworth – production (6, 8)
 Caleb Stone – production (7)
 Lo-Phi – production (9)
 Elos – production (10)
 Has-Lo – vocals (11), production (11)
 Toylight – production (12)
 Daddy Kev – mixing, mastering
 McKay Felt – artwork
 Sarah Dalton – graphic design
 Michael Tolle – executive production
 Mark Bowen – executive production

References

External links
 
 

2017 albums
Open Mike Eagle albums
Mello Music Group albums
Concept albums
Albums produced by Exile (producer)
Albums produced by Kenny Segal